Christopher Östlund (born  October 9, 1966) is the publisher of Plaza Magazine International, a magazine in the field of fashion, interior and design.

Östlund, born in Uppsala, Sweden, is the founder and owner of several international and Scandinavian magazines, including Plaza Magazine, Plaza Interiör, Plaza Kvinna, Hem Ljuva Hem, Hem Ljuva Hem Trädgård, Tove and Vimmel, Plaza Husguiden, Plaza Kök o Bad, Plaza Koti (Monthly Finnish interior title), Oma Koti Kullan Kallis (Finnish interior title), Swedish Gourmet (founded 1979) and Plaza Watch among several other medias. The Group publish 18 magazines in 48 countries in 5 languages.

External links
"Christopher Östlund "  webpage Plaza Publishing Group AB,
Östlund: Mediavärldens Kamprad artikel
Östlund: "Mediamogul vidgar vyerna"  artikel Svenska dagbladet, 2006-10-06 svd.se
"Mediamogul vidgar vyerna"  Christopher Östlund fyller 40 år artikel Svenska dagbladet, 2006-10-06 svd.se
Östlund: "Plaza till Mellanöstern"  artikel Svenska dagbladet, 2006-07-05 svd.se
Östlund: ""När det är som mörkast agerar jag". "Christopher Östlund 40 år" artikel på Dagens Nyheter"   2006-10-09 dn.se
Östlund: ""När det är som mörkast agerar jag". "Christopher Östlund 40 år" artikel på Dagens Nyheter"   2006-10-09 dn.se
""Dagens Jubilar Christopher Östlund 30 år"  artikel Svenska Dagbladet"  1996-10-09 svd.se

1966 births
Living people
Magazine publishers (people)
Swedish businesspeople
People from Uppsala